SHG may refer to:

 Sacred Heart-Griffin High School, Springfield, Illinois, US
 Samoyed hereditary glomerulopathy, a dog disease
 Scandinavian Hunter-Gatherer, an archaeogenetic lineage
 Second-harmonic generation in optical physics
 Segmented Hyper Graphics, a file format
 Self Help Graphics & Art
 Self-help group (finance)
 Standard German, also known as Standard High German
 Sweden Hockey Games
 SHG, IATA code for Shungnak Airport in Alaska, US